Mary Louise Peebles, née Parmelee (1833–1915), was an American author of children’s stories who wrote under the name Lynde Palmer.

Life
Mary Louise Peebles was the daughter of Elias Ripley Parmelee and Eleanor Allen, descendants of early settlers of the town of Lansingburgh (now part of Troy), New York. Peebles was born at Lansingburgh on December 10, 1833, and completed her education there seventeen years later at the Lansingburgh Academy. She married banker Anthony Augustus Peebles (1822–1905) on July 7, 1862, and eventually became the mother of two sons who did not survive infancy. Her aunt, Mary Eleanor Parmelee, was known for being an early love interest of the writer Herman Melville before she chose to marry instead a local merchant.

Mary Louise Peebles died on April 25, 1915. She had been a lifelong resident of Lansingburgh, New York.

Writing career
Mary Louise Peebles' book The Little Captain, published around 1861, was the first of a number of children's stories she would author over the following twenty years or so. In 1877 she released The Magnet Stories, a collection of children's yarns that included Drifting and Steering, One Day’s Weaving, Archie’s Shadow and John Jack.

Bibliography

 The Little Captain
 The Good Fight
 Stories for Boys
 Stories for Girls
 The Honorable Club
 Helps Over Hard Places
 Drifting and Steering
 One Day’s Weaving
 Archie’s Shadow
 John Jack
 Jeanette’s Cisterns
 Twinkle and Winkle
 Two Blizzards
 A Question of Honor, Where Honor Leads (for adults)

References

External links

 
 Lynde Palmer at LC Authorities, with 6 records
 Parmelee and Palmer at WorldCat

1833 births
1915 deaths
Pseudonymous women writers
19th-century American writers
American children's writers
19th-century American women writers
American women children's writers
Writers from New York (state)
People from Lansingburgh, New York
19th-century pseudonymous writers